Secondary school No. 1 is the oldest school of Kyzyl city, Central District, Tyva Republic.

The school is located at Kochetova st 59/3 in Kyzyl city, Tyva Republic, and has an associated elementary school building at no. p54 Schetinkino-Kravchenko.

The school was included in the "Gifted children are the future of Russia" encyclopedia.

Among the graduates of the school are many worthy Russian citizens, who today are well known figures of science, art and politics, including the Hero of Russia, Minister of Defence of Russia Sergei Shoigu.

History 
The school was established on 1 September 1916.

May 10, 1961 with decision of the Executive Committee of Kyzyl City Council of People's Deputies, due to the 45th anniversary of the school, the school was named in honor of Hero of the Soviet Union , who studied in the school.

100th anniversary 
October 28, 2016 the school celebrated its 100th anniversary.

Symbols 
In October 2016, in the school was established a memorial-table honored to internationalist fighter Andrei Belevsky

Awards 
The Diploma of the Russian national award "Elite of Russian education" in the nomination "Best Innovative Project".

References

External links
  
  100-летие отмечает первая школа города Кызыла

Schools in Russia
Education in Tuva
Kyzyl